Li Yun (born 15 January 1997) is a Chinese badminton player. She took part at the 2015 World Junior Championships, and helped the team clinch the Suhandinata Cup. Li was the women's singles runner-up at the 2015 Brasil Open Grand Prix, and won her first BWF World Tour title in 2019 SaarLorLux Open.

Achievements

BWF World Tour (1 title) 
The BWF World Tour, which was announced on 19 March 2017 and implemented in 2018, is a series of elite badminton tournaments sanctioned by the Badminton World Federation (BWF). The BWF World Tour is divided into levels of World Tour Finals, Super 1000, Super 750, Super 500, Super 300, and the BWF Tour Super 100.

Women's singles

BWF Grand Prix (1 runner-up) 
The BWF Grand Prix had two levels, the BWF Grand Prix and Grand Prix Gold. It was a series of badminton tournaments sanctioned by the Badminton World Federation (BWF) held from 2007 to 2017.

Women's singles

  BWF Grand Prix Gold tournament
  BWF Grand Prix tournament

BWF International Challenge/Series (1 runner-up) 
Women's singles

  BWF International Challenge tournament
  BWF International Series tournament
  BWF Future Series tournament

References

External links 
 

1997 births
Living people
Badminton players from Jiangxi
Chinese female badminton players
21st-century Chinese women